Soveral is a Portuguese surname. Notable people with the surname include:

André de Soveral (1572–1645), Portuguese-Brazilian Catholic saint and martyr
Francisco de Soveral (c.1565–1642) Portuguese bishop 
Isabel Soveral (born 1961), Portuguese composer 
Laura Soveral (1933–2018), Portuguese actress
Luís Pinto de Soveral, 1st Marquis of Soveral (1851–1922), Portuguese diplomat

Portuguese-language surnames